Henry Patrick Dixon (2 March 1918 – 29 December 1998) was an Irish Gaelic footballer. He played with a number of clubs, including Garrymore and Claremorris, and also lined out at inter-county level with the Mayo senior football team.

Career

Dixon's club career spanned four decades and four different clubs. After beginning his career with Carramore and Garrymore, he won a Mayo JFC title with Mayo Abbey in 1944. Dixon won a second junior title, this time with the Claremorris club, in 1960. He claimed a Mayo SFC medal with Claremorris in 1961 before bringing his club career to an end with a man of the match display in a defeat by Ballina Stephenites in 1962.

Dixon first appeared for Mayo in 1939, however, his emigration to England that year halted his inter-county progress. In 1944 he played with the Mayo junior team, while also making a few appearances for the senior team. Dixon was a non-playing substitute when Mayo were beaten by Cavan in the 1948 All-Ireland final. He became a regular member of the team the following year and claimed his first silverware after victory in the National League. 

Dixon was at centre-back when Mayo claimed back-to-back All-Ireland SFC titles after defeats of Louth in 1950 and Meath in 1951. He continued to line out for Mayo until 1954. HIs inter-county performances also earned inclusion on the Connacht team, with Dixon winning a Railway Cup medal in 1951.

Personal life and death

Dixon was born into a farming family just outside Claremorris in March 1918. He spent a number of years working in England g World War II. After returning home, Dixon opened his own pub in Claremorris in 1956.

Dixon died after a period of illness on 29 December 1998, at the age of 80.

Honours

Mayo Abbey
Mayo Junior Football Championship: 1944

Claremorris
Mayo Senior Football Championship: 1961
Mayo Junior Football Championship: 1960

Mayo
All-Ireland Senior Football Championship: 1950, 1951
Connacht Senior Football Championship: 1948, 1949, 1950, 1951
National Football League: 1948–49, 1953–54

Connacht
Railway Cup: 1951

References

1918 births
1998 deaths
Carramore Gaelic footballers
Garrymore Gaelic footballers
Mayo Abbey Gaelic footballers
Claremorris Gaelic footballers
Mayo inter-county Gaelic footballers
Drinking establishment owners